The Lehigh Valley AVA is an American Viticultural area located in the Lehigh Valley region of eastern Pennsylvania. The AVA includes portions of Lehigh, Northampton, Berks, Schuylkill, Carbon, and Monroe counties and the towns from Jim Thorpe to Easton, portions of the Schuylkill River Valley, the Brodhead Creek watershed in Monroe County and part of the Swatara Creek watershed to the west.

The wine region includes  of vineyards, planted to several Vitis vinifera and French-American hybrid grape varieties.  The climate of Lehigh Valley has been compared to the cooler climates of Central and Northern Europe, favoring the production of French-American hybrid grapes, especially Chambourcin. Between fifteen and twenty percent of the wine produced in Pennsylvania is made from grapes grown in the Lehigh Valley AVA.

The region has a humid continental climate (mostly Dfa/Dfb) and is located in hardiness zones 6b and 6a.

References

2008 establishments in Pennsylvania
American Viticultural Areas
Geography of Berks County, Pennsylvania
Geography of Carbon County, Pennsylvania
Geography of Lehigh County, Pennsylvania
Geography of Monroe County, Pennsylvania
Geography of Northampton County, Pennsylvania
Geography of Schuylkill County, Pennsylvania
Lehigh Valley
Pennsylvania wine